That Girl  is an American television sitcom that aired on ABC from September 8, 1966, to March 19, 1971. Over five seasons, 136 half-hour episodes of the series aired. All seasons are available on DVD.

Series overview

Episodes

Pilot

Season 1 (1966–67)

Season 2 (1967–68)

Season 3 (1968–69)

Season 4 (1969–70) 

Starting with this season, episode titles are shown on-screen, beginning with "Mission Improbable".

Season 5 (1970–71) 

In this, the final season of the series, lyrics are given to the opening theme music.

References 

General references

External links 
 

Lists of American sitcom episodes